The following is a list of 2009 Minnesota tornadoes. Minnesota is a state located in the North Central United States along the northern edge of Tornado Alley, and on average receives 24 tornadoes per year. 2009 was an average year historically, with 24 confirmed tornado touchdowns. Twenty-two of the tornadoes (91%) were considered minor, rated EF0 or EF1 on the Enhanced Fujita scale. The remaining two tornadoes were rated as significant, at EF2.

The 24 tornadoes combined to cause $4.5 million in damage, and they did not cause any fatalities or injuries. The date range of the tornadoes was smaller than normal, lasting just over two months, from just June 17–August 19. The first tornado date of June 17 marked the third-latest-starting tornado season on record in Minnesota since 1950, behind only 1951 (June 19) and 1952 (June 23).

The most unusual tornado event of the year occurred on August 19. Seven tornadoes were recorded in Minnesota that day, including one that touched down in Minneapolis. What made this day unusual is that a unique atmospheric setup allowed several of the tornadoes to be spawned from rain showers where no lightning was present.

Tornado descriptions

June

June 17 
A weak area of surface low pressure moved into extreme southeast North Dakota late on the afternoon of the June 17, with a warm front stretching across southeastern Minnesota. The warm front combined with pre-existing moisture from morning rainfall which led to rapid destabilization of the atmosphere during the afternoon hours. To the east of the low pressure area, surface dew point values rose into the middle 60s °F (18 °C) with temperatures near , causing a very unstable air mass to develop.

Two tornadoes were reported in west-central Minnesota in Wilkin County. Other, strong thunderstorms developed later just south of the warm front near Albert Lea and moved northeast. The thunderstorms quickly became tornadic north of Albert Lea, near Geneva, where a touchdown was observed. There were several reports of funnel clouds throughout the early evening with one more official touchdown near Waseca. The storms later turned to the southeast and impacted the Austin area, causing serious damage.

June 18 

Moisture levels were high on June 18, with surface dew points in the middle 60s °F (18 °C). Some morning cloud cover along the North Dakota/South Dakota border lifted north by afternoon which allowed a period of heating. Although the upper-level winds were fairly light, another in a series of upper-level disturbances shifted over this region by mid-afternoon. This helped initiate thunderstorm development over southeast North Dakota and west central Minnesota, leading to two tornadoes near Carlisle and Dent.

June 21 

During the late afternoon a very warm and humid air mass lifted northward across northern Iowa and into far southern Minnesota. Several weak storms formed in northwest and north central Iowa and moved into south central Minnesota where a warm front laid. Winds shifted from the south to the east and southeast across Freeborn and Faribault counties of far south central Minnesota. The combination of increasing wind shear near the boundary layer and enough lift from thunderstorms allowed brief tornadoes to develop.

July

July 7 

Thunderstorms produced damaging winds, hail, and one tornado in Murray and Cottonwood Counties in southwest Minnesota on the late afternoon of July 7.

July 14 

A strong cold front, deep moisture and a high wind shear environment led to severe weather across portions of central Minnesota during the late-afternoon hours. Several individual storms developed across west central Minnesota and moved quickly northeast; spawning three tornadoes.

August

August 8 

A very unstable air mass was in place across the upper Midwest with a warm front draped from the Twin Cities area into west-central Wisconsin. A strong capping inversion suppressed thunderstorm development until near sunset, when a supercell thunderstorm developed in the western part of Hennepin County ahead of an advancing cold front near a surface low pressure center. The supercell would produce a tornado in Hennepin county before tracking eastward across the northern Twin Cities metro area and into Wisconsin where it produced two more tornadoes.

August 19 

Low pressure was moving into Minnesota from the west-southwest on Wednesday, August 19, causing a large area of shower activity to shroud east-central and south-central Minnesota during the morning and early-afternoon hours. The low began to deepen rapidly in the late morning and early afternoon as it moved northeast over the Twin Cities metro area.

Embedded circulations began to develop within the shower activity by 2:00 pm CDT, when the deepening low started to produce strong atmospheric wind speeds which were turning in the lower portion of the atmosphere. These circulations were moving quickly to the north and many were not associated with thunderstorms; there were only a handful of cloud-to-ground lightning strikes all afternoon in the areas where damage was reported.

While there was relatively little instability, there was enough rising air and surface inflow to stretch these circulations at times and form short-lived tornadoes.

See also 
 List of 2008 Minnesota tornadoes
 Climate of Minnesota
 List of North American tornadoes and tornado outbreaks

References 

Climate of Minnesota
Tornadoes in Minnesota
Tornadoes of 2009
2009 in Minnesota